The Grand-Ducal Fire and Rescue Corps (in French: , or CGDIS) has been the fire brigade of the Grand Duchy of Luxembourg since 1 July 2018.

Ranks

Former Ranks

References

Firefighters